The 1949 Richmond Spiders football team was an American football team that represented the University of Richmond as a member of the Southern Conference (SoCon) during the 1949 college football season. In their second season under head coach Karl Esleeck, Richmond compiled a 3–7 record, with a mark of 2–6 in conference play, finishing in 15th place in the SoCon.

Schedule

References

Richmond
Richmond Spiders football seasons
Richmond Spiders football